Christopher Priest (born 18 October 1973, Leigh) is an English former professional footballer who is believed to have scored the final Football League goal of the 20th Century when playing for Macclesfield Town.

Playing career
A midfielder, Priest began his career as an apprentice with Everton, where he turned professional in June 1992. However, he failed to make a first–team appearance and his first taste of league action was to come when on loan at Football League Division Two strugglers Chester City during 1994–95. He spent two months on loan with the club early in the season, scoring in a shock 2–0 win over league leaders Oxford United, and then signed on a permanent basis later in the campaign.

Priest remained with Chester for four years, playing regularly before opting to join fellow Third Division side Macclesfield Town on the Bosman ruling in July 1999.

External links

Welsh Premier career stats

References

1973 births
English footballers
Footballers from Leigh, Greater Manchester
English Football League players
Cymru Premier players
Association football midfielders
Everton F.C. players
Chester City F.C. players
Macclesfield Town F.C. players
Bangor City F.C. players
Colwyn Bay F.C. players
Living people